The 2017 Shanghai Greenland Shenhua season was Shanghai Greenland Shenhua's 14th season in the Chinese Super League and 55th overall in the Chinese top flight. They also competed in the Chinese FA Cup and AFC Champions League.

Season events
On 29 November 2016, Gus Poyet was appointed as the club's new manager, replacing Gregorio Manzano.

On 30 June 2017, it was announced that Fredy Guarín had signed a new two-year contract with the club until end of 2019.

On 11 September 2017, after a home defeat to Henan Jianye, Poyet resigned as manager of the club. Technical director and former head coach Wu Jingui was placed in charge for Shenhua's remaining games.

On 19 November 2017, before the first leg of 2017 Chinese FA Cup final began, it was announced that Cao Yunding, Bai Jiajun, Li Yunqiu and Bi Jinhao all had signed new five-year contracts with the club until 2022.

On 26 November 2017, Shenhua beat Shanghai SIPG to win the 2017 Chinese FA Cup on the away goals rule after second leg of the final ended 3-2 to make it 3-3 on aggregate. It was Shenhua's first FA Cup triumph since 1998 and earned them a place in next season's AFC Champions League.

Squad

Source：

Reserve squad

On loan

Transfers

Winter

In:

 
 
 
 
 

 

Out:

Summer

In:

Out:

Competitions

Chinese Super League

Results summary

Results

Table

Chinese FA Cup

Final

3–3 on aggregate. Shanghai Greenland Shenhua won on away goals.

AFC Champions League

Qualifying stage

Squad statistics

Appearances and goals

|-
|colspan="14"|Players who away from the club on loan:

|-
|colspan="14"|Players who left Shanghai Greenland Shenhua during the season:
|}

Goal scorers

Disciplinary Record

Notes

References

External links
Official Website

Shanghai Shenhua F.C. seasons
Shanghai Greenland Shenhua F.C.